Adam Schindler (born May 19, 1983) is an American mixed martial artist who last competed in 2013. A professional from 2009 until 2013, he fought for Bellator and Strikeforce.

Mixed martial arts career

Bellator Fighting Championships
Schindler made his Bellator debut on May 27, 2010, when he faced Brian Melancon at Bellator 20. He won via unanimous decision. He then dropped to Featherweight to compete in Bellator's Featherweight Tournament, facing Ronnie Mann at Bellator 46 on June 25, 2011. He lost via KO (punches) in the first round.

In his last fight with Bellator, Schindler faced Jeremy Spoon at Bellator 56 on October 29, 2011. He lost via unanimous decision and asked to be released from his contract shortly thereafter

Legacy FC
Schindler signed with Legacy FC in April 2013, and quickly made his debut in May, replacing Junior Assuncao to face Chris Pecero at Legacy FC 20. He lost via TKO in the second round.

Strikeforce
Schindler is a one-fight veteran in now-defunct promotion Strikeforce, he made his debut on August 21, 2010, facing Kierre Gooch at Strikeforce: Houston. He won via rear-naked choke submission.

Championships and accomplishments
Battlegrounds
Battlegrounds Lightweight Championship (One time)
International Xtreme Fight Association
IXFA Lightweight Championship (One time)

Mixed martial arts record

|-
|Loss
|align=center|10–6
|Chris Pecero
|TKO (knees)
|Legacy FC 20
|
|align=center|2
|align=center|1:02
|Corpus Christi, Texas, United States
|Featherweight bout.
|-
|Loss
|align=center|10–5
|Chase Hackett
|TKO (knee injury)
|Fight To Win: Superheroes
|
|align=center|1
|align=center|1:54
|Denver, Colorado, United States
|For the Fight To Win Lightweight Championship.
|-
|Win
|align=center|10–4
|Yoshiaki Takahashi
|TKO (punches)
|G1 Fights: Sovereign Valor
|
|align=center|1
|align=center|2:55
|Kinder, Louisiana, United States
|Return to Lightweight.
|-
|Loss
|align=center|9–4
|Jeremy Spoon
|Decision (unanimous)
|Bellator 56
|
|align=center|3
|align=center|5:00
|Kansas City, Kansas, United States
|
|-
|Loss
|align=center|9–3
|Ronnie Mann
|KO (punches)
|Bellator 46
|
|align=center|1
|align=center|4:14
|Hollywood, Florida, United States
|Featherweight debut.
|-
|Win
|align=center|9–2
|Marc Ramirez
|Decision (split)
|International Xtreme Fight Association
|
|align=center|5
|align=center|5:00
| Houston, Texas, United States
|Won the IXFA Lightweight Championship.
|-
|Win
|align=center|8–2
|Kierre Gooch
|Submission (rear-naked choke)
|Strikeforce: Houston
|
|align=center|1
|align=center|1:58
| Houston, Texas, United States
|
|-
|Win
|align=center|7–2
|Brian Melancon
|Decision (unanimous)
|Bellator 20
|
|align=center|3
|align=center|5:00
| San Antonio, Texas, United States
|Catchweight (161 lbs) bout.
|-
|Win
|align=center|6–2
|Christopher Golden
|Submission (rear-naked choke)
|Supreme Warrior Championship 10
|
|align=center|1
|align=center|0:24
| Frisco, Texas, United States
|
|-
|Win
|align=center|5–2
|David Fuentes
|Submission (arm-triangle choke)
|South Texas Fighting Championships 9
|
|align=center|1
|align=center|1:41
|McAllen, Texas, United States
|
|-
|Win
|align=center|4–2
|Lane Yarbrough
|Decision (unanimous)
|King of Kombat 7
|
|align=center|3
|align=center|5:00
|Austin, Texas, United States
|
|-
|Loss
|align=center|3–2
|Derrick Krantz
|TKO (punches)
|Ascend Combat: Best of the Best Tournament
|
|align=center|2
|align=center|1:14
| Shreveport, Louisiana, United States
|
|-
|Loss
|align=center|3–1
|Derek Campos
|Decision (unanimous)
|King of Kombat 6
|
|align=center|3
|align=center|5:00
| Austin, Texas, United States
|
|-
|Win
|align=center|3–0
|Gary Hancock
|Submission (rear-naked choke)
|Battlegrounds 5
|
|align=center|1
|align=center|3:21
| New Orleans, Louisiana, United States
|Won the Battlegrounds Lightweight Championship.

|-
|Win
|align=center|2–0
|Justin Reiswerg
|Submission (guillotine choke
|King of Kombat 5
|
|align=center|2
|align=center|1:42
| Austin, Texas, United States
|
|-
|Win
|align=center|1–0
|Jorge Batista
|Submission (keylock)
|Katana Cagefighting: Equi-Knocks
|
|align=center|2
|align=center|1:24
| Robstown, Texas, United States
|
|-

References

External links

1983 births
Living people
Featherweight mixed martial artists
Lightweight mixed martial artists
Welterweight mixed martial artists
American male mixed martial artists
Sportspeople from Houston
Mixed martial artists from Texas